USS LST-979 was an  in the United States Navy. Like many of her class, she was not named and is properly referred to by her hull designation.

Construction
LST-979 was laid down on 19 December 1944, at Hingham, Massachusetts, by the Bethlehem-Hingham Shipyard; launched on 23 January 1945; sponsored by Mrs. A. H. Balsley; and commissioned on 20 February 1945.

Service history
Following World War II, LST-979 performed occupation duty in the Far East and saw service in China until late March 1946. She returned to the United States and was decommissioned on 5 July 1946, and struck from the Navy list on 28 August, that same year. On 4 November 1947, the ship was sold to the Moore Drydock Co., Oakland, California, for scrapping.

Notes

Citations

Bibliography 

Online resources

External links
 

 

LST-542-class tank landing ships
World War II amphibious warfare vessels of the United States
Ships built in Hingham, Massachusetts
1945 ships